Estádio Arena do Município Verde is a stadium located in Paragominas, Brazil. It is used mostly for football matches and hosts the home matches of Paragominas. The stadium has a maximum capacity of 10,000 people.

References

External links
Estádio Arena do Município Verde on OGol
Estádio Arena do Município Verde on Federação Paraense de Futebol

Football venues in Pará